The 1968–69 Boston Bruins season was the Bruins' 45th season in the NHL.

Offseason

Regular season

The Bruins set several league records for scoring, both team and individual.  Phil Esposito broke league records for points and assists, becoming the first player in NHL history to exceed 100 points, with 126 and 77 respectively.  With linemates Ken Hodge and Ron Murphy, he shared in a new record for most points by a forward line with 263.  Bobby Orr set new league records for goals and points by a defenseman with 21 and 64.  The team as a whole scored the most goals in history with 303, and were awarded the most penalty minutes with 1297.

Season standings

Record vs. opponents

Schedule and results

Playoffs
Eastern Conference Semi-finals

Eastern Conference Finals

Player statistics

Regular season
Scoring

Goaltending

Playoffs
Scoring

Goaltending

Awards and records
Phil Esposito, Art Ross Trophy
Phil Esposito, Hart Memorial Trophy
Phil Esposito, NHL First Team All-Star
Ted Green, NHL Second Team All-Star
Bobby Orr, James Norris Memorial Trophy
Bobby Orr, NHL Plus/Minus Award
Bobby Orr, NHL First Team All-Star

Transactions

Draft picks

NHL Draft

Farm teams

See also
 1968–69 NHL season

References
 Bruins on Hockey Database

Boston Bruins
Boston Bruins
Boston Bruins seasons
Boston Bruins
Boston Bruins
1960s in Boston